Tugimaantee 12 (ofcl. abbr. T12), also called the Kose–Jägala highway, is a 36.1-kilometre-long national basic road in northern Estonia. The highway begins at Kose on national road 2 and ends at Jägala on national road 13.

Route
T12 is located entirely in Harju County and it passes through the following municipalities:
Anija Parish
Kose Parish

See also
 Transport in Estonia

References

External links

N12